Bus Conductor is 2005 Indian Malayalam-language drama film directed by V. M. Vinu. The film stars Mammootty in the lead role as Kunjakka, along with Adithya Menon, Jayasurya, Bhavana, Nikita Thukral, Mamta Mohandas, Innocent, Harisree Ashokan and Kalpana in supporting roles. The film revolves around Kunjakka, a bus conductor and the problems him and his family face. The film was released on 23 December 2005 on Christmas week. The film received mixed reviews from critics. However despite that the film a commercial success.

Plot
The story, set in the Malabar culture, revolves around Zakir Hussain aka Kunjakka. This bus conductor lords over the family that has a motley cast to it - The mother, her husband, sister, son, daughters and his own sister Selina. Then there are his bus mates and the police cunning sub-inspector Sajan George.

Being a good man, Kunjakka is faced with all kinds of troubles and responsibility. On the one hand he has to take on the wily cop Sajan George, who also runs a bus company on the side. Then the problems within the family come to hand. Najeeb's dalliance with a local girl ends in her becoming pregnant. But Najeeb goes to Dubai leaving the girl in the lurch. So the responsibility of looking after her also falls on Kunjakka's shoulders. There are misunderstandings in the family and his only solace is Noorjahan.

The story then is about how Kunjakka unties all the knots of distrust and disappointments.

Cast

Soundtrack
The film features original songs composed by M. Jayachandran. 
"Etho Rathri (Male)" - K. J. Yesudas
"Manathe" - Rimi Tomy, Madhu Balakrishnan
"Kondotty" - Rimi Tomy, Vidhu Prathap, Madhu Balakrishnan
"Ethorathri (Female)" - K. S. Chithra

Reception

Critical reception 
Sify gives the film an 'Average' verdict and writes: " Initially Bus Conductor is quite an enjoyable ride with Harishree Asokan, Kalpana and others. Mammootty keeps you entertained with his wise cracks and mirrors the pitiable condition of workers of private buses in Kerala. But the film starts hitting potholes as soon as the script writer and director introduces fake emotions laced with sentiments. As the film winds down to its finale there is a sense of deja vu. More importantly in this day and age, it is a bit regressive and misleading for the director to think that the hero can be the protector of a woman without any strings attached. Vinu, where is the twist in the tale? M. Jayachandran is losing his magic touch as there is not even one song which is hummable. The background score is similar to Tamil superstar films, where they scream the title of the movie as the hero delivers a blow to the villain or utters a punch line. Perhaps the high point of the film is the artwork of Bobban who has realistically created a bus stand that you see in towns of Kerala. Bus Conductor is a rough ride strictly for the die-hard fans of Mammookka!"

Box office 
The film was a commercial success.

References

External links
 

2000s Malayalam-language films
2005 films
Films about buses
Films shot in Kozhikode
Films shot in Kannur
Films shot in Thalassery
Films directed by V. M. Vinu
Films scored by M. Jayachandran